Colleges in Bangladesh are Higher Secondary schools for last two years of 12 academic year long school education. After finishing Secondary education (10th Grade/SSC/Equivalent) students get admitted to these colleges to study for 11th and 12th Grade. Students graduate from the colleges or higher secondary schools after passing in the HSC/Equivalent Examination. 
This is a list of Colleges in Bangladesh. The syllabus most common in usage is the National Curriculum and Textbooks, which has two versions, a Bengali version and an English version. Edexcel and Cambridge syllabus are also used for most of the English-medium schools.

Colleges

Specialized Colleges

Specialized engineering colleges
 Affiliated with DU        
 Mymensingh Engineering College       
 Faridpur Engineering College        
 Barisal Engineering College
 Affiliated with SUST       
 Sylhet Engineering College
 Affiliated with RU      
 Rangpur Engineering College

Specialized science and technology colleges 
 Affiliated with BUP        
 Military Institute of Science and Technology
 Affiliated with HSTU
 Shahid Akbar Ali Science & Technology College

Specialized textile engineering colleges 
Affiliated with Bangladesh Textile University.
 Textile Engineering College, Chittagong   
 Begumganj Textile Engineering College, Noakhali   
 Pabna Textile Engineering College 
 Shaheed Abdur Rab Serniabat Textile Engineering College, Barisal    
 Sheikh Kamal Textile Engineering College , Jhenaidah    
 Bangabandhu Textile Engineering College, Kalihati, Tangail

See also

 Education in Bangladesh
 List of universities in Bangladesh
 List of schools in Bangladesh

References

External links
 List of Colleges of Bangladesh

 Colleges